Arthur Davis may refer to:

Entertainment
 Arthur Davis (animator) (1905–2000), American animator and director
 Art Davis (actor) (1913–1987), American musician, singer, and actor
 Art Davis (1934–2007), American jazz bassist
 Arthur Hoey Davis, Australian writer who used the pen name Steele Rudd

Sports
 Art Davis (American football) (1934–2021), American football player
 Arthur Davis (English cricketer) (1882–1916), English cricketer
 Arthur Davis (Australian cricketer) (1898–1943), Australian cricketer
 Arthur Davis (gymnast) (born 1974), American gymnast

Other
 Arthur Powell Davis (1861–1933), American hydrographer and engineer
 Arthur Vining Davis (1867–1962), American businessman and philanthropist
 Arthur Joseph Davis (1878–1951), British architect
 Arthur C. Davis (1893–1965), United States Navy admiral
 Arthur P. Davis (1904–1996), African-American university teacher, literary scholar, and writer
 Arthur Marshall Davis (1907–1963), U.S. federal judge
 Artur Davis (born 1967), American politician

See also 
 Arthur Davis Glacier in Antarctica
 Arthur Davies (disambiguation)